XHJF-FM is a radio station on 105.1 FM in Tierra Blanca, Veracruz, known as Radio Max.

History
XEJF-AM 1350 received its concession on December 6, 1964. It was a 500-watt station owned by Carmen Romero de Bravo. Roldán acquired it in 1979 and it moved to 1050 with 5,000 watts in the early 2000s.

XEJF moved to FM in 2010.

References

Radio stations in Veracruz
Radio stations established in 1964